Amit Kumar Suman (born 10 December 1980) is an Indian former cricketer. He played first-class cricket for Delhi and Oxford University between 1998 and 2005.

See also
 List of Delhi cricketers

References

External links
 
 

1980 births
Living people
Indian cricketers
British Universities cricketers
Delhi cricketers
Oxford University cricketers
Cricketers from Bihar
Alumni of Pembroke College, Oxford
Haryana cricketers
Oxford MCCU cricketers